The 1991 Toledo Rockets football team was an American football team that represented the University of Toledo in the Mid-American Conference (MAC) during the 1991 NCAA Division I-A football season. In their first season under head coach Gary Pinkel, the Rockets compiled a 5–5–1 record (4–3–1 against MAC opponents), finished in a tie for third place in the MAC, and outscored all opponents by a combined total of 269 to 153.

The team's statistical leaders included Kevin Meger with 1,787 passing yards, Steve Cowan with 748 rushing yards, and Marcus Goodwin with 600 receiving yards.

Schedule

References

Toledo
Toledo Rockets football seasons
Toledo Rockets football